Saint-Jean–Napierville was a former provincial electoral district in the province of Quebec, Canada.

It was created for the 1939 election from all of Saint-Jean and part of Napierville-Laprairie electoral districts.  It existed for only that one general election and a 1941 by-election.  It disappeared in the 1944 election and its successor electoral district was the recreated Saint-Jean.

Members of the Legislative Assembly
 Alexis Bouthillier, Liberal (1939–1940)
 Jean-Paul Beaulieu, Union Nationale (1941–1944)

External links
 Election results (National Assembly)
 Election results (Quebecpolitique.com)

Former provincial electoral districts of Quebec